is a video game by Hudson Soft originally released in 1984 for the NEC PC-8801, NEC PC-6001, FM-7 and MSX Japanese home computers.

It was ported on May 27, 1988, to the Famicom, and February 8, 1991 for the Nintendo Entertainment System in North America. It was also released on the Wii's Virtual Console in Japan on January 19, 2010, and in North America on February 8, 2010.

The characters are primarily cartoon-like anthropomorphic fruits and vegetables, though the game does contain some human characters, including Princess Tomato's sister, Lisa, and the villainous Farmies.

Plot

Taking the role of Sir Cucumber, a knight, the player is assigned by  King Broccoli (now deceased) to defeat the evil Minister Pumpkin, who has kidnapped Princess Tomato. Early on, Sir Cucumber gains a sidekick, Percy the baby persimmon, who offers advice and helps throughout the quest (and always refers to Sir Cucumber as "Boss").

Gameplay
Princess Tomato in the Salad Kingdom plays similarly to a text adventure, though due to the NES's lack of a keyboard accessory, the possible commands are represented by buttons which line both sides of the screen. The commands are fixed and do not change during gameplay. Primarily, the game consists of still screens, with the exception of the "finger wars", mazes and occasional animated character, such as the octoberry and fernbirds. Players can issue commands to the game's protagonist. While the player may run into difficulty determining which actions will advance the game, the only way to "lose" is by failing to defeat the end-game boss, Minister Pumpkin, in a final game of "finger wars".

Legacy 
Princess Tomato makes an appearance in Super Bomberman R as a playable DLC character named "Princess Tomato Bomber." She was added in the 2.0 update released November 15, 2017.

See also
List of Nintendo Entertainment System games
List of Hudson Soft games

References

External links

1984 video games
1991 video games
Adventure games
Fictional princesses
FM-7 games
Fruit and vegetable characters
Hudson Soft games
MSX games
NEC PC-6001 games
NEC PC-8001 games
NEC PC-8801 games
Nintendo Entertainment System games
Sharp MZ games
Sharp X1 games
Single-player video games
Video games about food and drink
Video games developed in Japan
Virtual Console games
Virtual Console games for Wii U